The Wills Developmental Road is a  road in north-west Queensland running between Julia Creek and Burketown. There are no major towns along the entire route, but fuel and supplies are available at the Burke and Wills Roadhouse at Four Ways, and also at Gregory. The Wills Developmental Road joins the Burke Developmental Road for approximately 1.2 kilometres, avoiding a direct crossroads at their intersection. Two major rivers are crossed by the Wills Developmental Road en route, the Cloncurry and the Leichhardt.

Wills Developmental Road, Taldora, Gulf Country, June 2019

Road train on the Wills Developmental Road, Four Ways, June 2019

Major intersections

See also

 Highways in Australia
 List of highways in Queensland

References

Highways in Queensland
North West Queensland